Anoixi is a village of the Deskati municipality. Before the 2011 local government reform it was part of the municipality of Chasia. The 2011 census recorded 93 inhabitants in the village. Anoixi is a part of the community of Trikokkia.

See also
 List of settlements in the Grevena regional unit

References

Populated places in Grevena (regional unit)